Gene C11orf16, chromosome 11 open reading frame 16, is a protein in humans that is encoded by the C11orf16 gene. It has 7 exons, and the size of 467 amino acids.

Gene

Location
The gene C11orf16 is located on chromosome 11(p15.4), starting at 8,920,076bp and ending at 8,933,006bp.

Gene neighborhood
Gene ASCL3 and AKIP1 are the neighbor genes of C11orf16 on chromosome 11.

Expression

Human
The gene does not have high expression throughout the body tissues. The percentile rank within the sample are higher in pancreas, ovary, and appendix.

Mouse brain
Even though the gene does not have a significant high expression in the mouse brain, it is most expressed in midbrain, isocortex, olfactory areas, and medulla.

Transcription factors
Some transcription factors that have the higher matrix similarity are Kruppel-like zinc finger protein 219, zinc finger protein 263, ZKSCAN12 (zinc finger protein with KRAB and SCAN domains 12), chorion-specific transcription factor GCMa, and Ras-responsive element binding protein 1.

mRNA

Isoform
The predicted C11orf16 transcript variant X1 is 2386bp long and has NCBI accession number of XM_017018013.1.

Homology

Paralogs
No paralogs were found for the C11orf16 gene through NCBI BLAST.

Orthologs

Conservation
The gene C11orf16 is conserved in many animal species including mammals, avians, and reptiles.

Protein

Molecular weight
The predicted molecular weight of the protein encoded by C11orf16 is 51 kiloDaltons.

Domains and motifs
Several protein domains and motifs were found including CHD5-like protein, tyrosine kinase phosphorylation site, protein kinase C phosphorylation site, N-myristoylation site, casein kinase II phosphorylation site, and cGMP-dependent protein kinase phosphorylation site. The picture indicates the location of the motifs.

Secondary structure
The protein is predicted to be made up with 21.2% of alpha helix, 15.2% of extended strand, and 63% of random coil.

Post-translational modifications
No transmembrane helices, potential GPI-modification sites, or TM-proteins were found. There were seven predicted sumoylation sites, multiple phosporylation cites with most of them being unsp, and nine glycosylation sites.

Subcellular localization predictor
The protein is predicted to be localized to the nucleus with the probability of 47.8%; mitochondria with the probability of 26.1%.

Protein interaction
Proteins C1orf105 (Chromosome 1 open reading frame 105), PWWP2A, and SMYD1(SET and MYND domain containing 1) were found to be interacting with C11orf16.

Clinical significance

Disease association
Protein coded by C11orf16 gene is also predicted to have 19.61% sequence identity to tumor suppressor p53-binding protein suggesting that this gene might be involved with tumor suppressing process.

References

External links
 
 C11orf16 information on GeneCards

Further reading

